Tonye is a given name and a surname.  It is a feminine given name variant of the French and Latin Antoinette. As a surname, it is most prevalent in Camaroon. Tamunotonye and its shortened version Tonye are Ijaw unisex given names that are prominent in Nigeria where it is most commonly used among the Kalabari, Okrika, and Nembe people of Rivers State, Bayelsa State, and Delta State. The name translates to English as "God's will", "God's desire", "favor from God", or "God's plan".

Given name
Tonye Briggs-Oniyide, Nigerian businessperson and politician
Tonye Cole (born 1967), Nigerian businessman
Tonye Garrick (born 1983), British-born Nigerian singer
Tonye Ibiama (born 1974), Nigerian businessman
Tonye Jekiri (born 1994), Nigerian basketball player
Tonye Patano (born 1961), American actress
Tonye Princewill (born 1969), British-born Nigerian politician

Middle name
Alabo Tonye Graham-Douglas, known as Alabo Graham-Douglas (born 1939), Nigerian politician
Dale Antou Tonye Ian Virgo, known as Dale Dizzle Virgo or simply Dizzle (born 1985), Jamaican record producer, musician, engineer and an entrepreneur

Surname
Isaie Tonye (born 1951), Cameroonian wrestler
Herve Tonye-Tonye (born 1988), Canadian gridiron football player

See also

Tone (name)
Toney (name)
Tonge (surname)
Tonie
Tonje
Tonne (name)
Tony (given name)
Tonya (given name)
Tonyee Chow

Notes

French feminine given names